Zasheyek is the name of several rural localities in Russia:
Zasheyek, Republic of Karelia, a village in Loukhsky District of the Republic of Karelia
Zasheyek, Murmansk Oblast, an inhabited locality under the administrative jurisdiction of Polyarnye Zori City with Jurisdictional Territory in Murmansk Oblast